Parle is a village in the city of Kolhapur located in the southwestern state of Maharashtra, India.

History
There is a substantial amount of Chardo families in this area as they had migrated due to the persecution of the Portuguese in Goa.

Language
Konkani is the main language, spoken in Goa as it is in close proximity to Goa, Many Goans have settled here when they migrated from Goa.

References

Villages in Kolhapur district